Farm to Market Road 2696 (FM 2696) is a  farm to market road in Bexar County, Texas. It is known in Greater San Antonio as Blanco Road, a major north–south thoroughfare.

Route description
FM 2696 begins at Interstate 410 at the western fringe of Uptown San Antonio, just east of Castle Hills. The route travels north through north central San Antonio, crossing Wurzbach Parkway and Loop 1604. It then runs along the eastern edge of the Camp Bullis Military Training Reservation. The designation ends just south of the Comal County line; however, Blanco Road itself continues into Comal County to an intersection with SH 46.

History
FM 2696 was designated on March 22, 1961, from Loop 410 (now Interstate 410) northward  to the Camp Bullis Entrance. The segment between I-410 and Loop 1604 was officially changed to Urban Road 2696 (UR 2696) on June 27, 1995; the designation reverted to FM 2696 with the elimination of the Urban Road system on November 15, 2018.

On December 18, 2014, the northernmost  of the route, from the San Antonio city limit near Calico Landing to the Comal County line, was removed from the state highway system and returned to Bexar County. A previous turnback proposal would have decommissioned the entirety of FM 2696, but it was rejected by San Antonio city officials. The city instead passed a different proposal, which also resulted in the turnback of many other highways, on the day that FM 2696 was truncated.

Major intersections

References

2696
Transportation in Bexar County, Texas